Tamale Boy is a Mexican restaurant chain with multiple locations in the Portland, Oregon metropolitan area, in the United States.

Description 
The menu has included tamales, burritos, enchiladas, mole, and posoles.

History 
Initially operating as a food cart, Tamale Boy opened as a brick and mortar restaurant on Northeast Dekum in the Woodlawn neighborhood in 2014. In 2016, a second location opened on Russell Street in the north Portland part of the Eliot neighborhood. In 2020, owner Jaime Soltero Jr. announced plans to expand into a food hall in Happy Valley. In 2022, Soltero announced plans to relocate the business's headquarters from Portland to Tigard.

Reception 
Michelle DeVona and Brooke Jackson-Glidden included Tamale Boy in Eater Portland 2021 list of "13 Dynamite Dog-Friendly Bars and Restaurants in Portland". Jackson-Glidden also included the Dekum location in a 2022 list of "Where to Find Tasty Tamales in Portland and Beyond" and wrote, " Likely the most famous spot in Portland for tamales, Tamale Boy’s wide range of both Oaxacan and Northern Mexican variations make it a local favorite."

See also
 Hispanics and Latinos in Portland, Oregon
 List of Mexican restaurants

References

External links

 
 Tamale Boy at Fodor's
 Tamale Boy at Zomato

Clackamas County, Oregon
Eliot, Portland, Oregon
Food carts in Portland, Oregon
Mexican restaurants in Oregon
Mexican restaurants in Portland, Oregon
North Portland, Oregon
Northeast Portland, Oregon